"He Got You" is a song written by Ralph Murphy and Bobby Wood, recorded by American country music artist Ronnie Milsap.  It was released in August 1982 as the second single from the album Inside.

Song history
"He Got You" was Ronnie Milsap's 32nd single release and his 20th No.1 hit on the country charts.  It was a major hit on the Adult Contemporary charts as well, peaking at number 15. It also had minor success on the pop charts, stopping at No. 59. The song is one of Milsap's most popular recordings and still receives reasonable airplay to this day.

Charts

References

1982 singles
1982 songs
Ronnie Milsap songs
Songs written by Ralph Murphy (musician)
Song recordings produced by Tom Collins (record producer)
RCA Records singles
Songs written by Bobby Wood (songwriter)